Aleksandra Król (born 20 November 1990 in Zakopane) is a Polish snowboarder. She competed at the FIS Snowboarding World Championships 2011 and 2013; both times in parallel giant slalom and parallel slalom. She competed at the 2014 Winter Olympics in Sochi, in parallel giant slalom and parallel slalom.

In February 2023, she won a bronze medal at the Snowboarding World Championships in Bakuriani, Georgia, in the parallel giant slalom.

References

External links

1990 births
Living people
Sportspeople from Zakopane
Snowboarders at the 2014 Winter Olympics
Snowboarders at the 2018 Winter Olympics
Snowboarders at the 2022 Winter Olympics
Polish female snowboarders
Olympic snowboarders of Poland
Universiade medalists in snowboarding
Universiade gold medalists for Poland
Competitors at the 2017 Winter Universiade
21st-century Polish women